Cindy Ann Fisher (born August 2, 1964) is the head women's basketball coach at the University of San Diego.

Early Years (1994-1998)
She also served as an assistant coach at Weber State University and Old Dominion University.

Wyoming Cowgirls (1998-2003)
Fisher led the Cowgirls for five years and finishing with a 59-81 record, where she led the Cowgirls to the WNIT Second Round in her final season as head coach.

Nebraska Cornhuskers Assistant Coach (2003-2005)
Fisher was appointed to top assistant coach for the Nebraska Cornhuskers. She led Nebraska to back-to-back WNIT appearances in her two seasons there. In 2005, Nebraska won 103-99 against fifth ranked Baylor, the highest ranked opponent Nebraska defeated in team history.

San Diego Toreros (2005-present)
From 2005 to 2006, she orchestrated the largest turnaround in school history, implementing a 12 game improvement over the previous year.  In the 2007-2008 season, Fisher led the Toreros to the NCAA tournament with an upset over the Gonzaga Bulldogs in the WCC championship game.  In addition to the NCAA tournament in 2008, Fisher led the Toreros to eight WNIT appearances.  In the 2019-2020 season, Fisher turned the Toreros from a 2-16, tied for last place finish the season before to a 13-5 second place finish. The team's performance led West Coast conference to award her Coach of the Year honors.

Head coaching record

Awards and honors
WCC Coach of the Year- 3 times (2007, 2012 & 2020)

References

External links
San Diego biography

1964 births
Living people
American women's basketball coaches
Illinois State Redbirds women's basketball coaches
Junior college women's basketball coaches in the United States
Nebraska Cornhuskers women's basketball coaches
Old Dominion Monarchs women's basketball coaches
San Diego Toreros women's basketball coaches
Weber State Wildcats women's basketball coaches
Wyoming Cowgirls basketball coaches